The Thomaston Times was a Thomaston, Georgia based newspaper. The newspaper operated for more than 145 years, and was the oldest active business in Thomaston, GA.  It ceased operations on December 29, 2015.

References

Upson County, Georgia
Newspapers published in Georgia (U.S. state)
Publications established in 1869
1869 establishments in Georgia (U.S. state)